B90 may refer to :
 B90 nuclear bomb
 Sicilian Defence, Najdorf Variation, Encyclopaedia of Chess Openings code
 B90 FM (1990-1993), a radio station in Wellington, New Zealand
 Bündnis 90 (Alliance 90), a German political coalition
 Bundesstraße 90, a road in Germany
 Nassfeld Straße, a road in Austria
 A postcode area in Solihull, West Midlands, England
 B90, a type of Docklands Light Railway train